Henry Berry (1719–1812) was an English engineer.

Henry Berry may also refer to:

Henry Berry (politician) (1883–1956), British Labour party Member of Parliament for Woolwich West 1945–1950
Henry Berry (rugby union) (1883–1915), English rugby union player
Henry Berry Lowrie (born 1844), outlaw
Henry Seymour Berry, 1st Baron Buckland (1877–1928), Welsh industrialist

See also
W. H. Berry (1870–1951), an English comic actor
Henry Barry (disambiguation)